A pub crawl (sometimes called a bar tour, bar crawl or bar-hopping) is the act of visiting multiple pubs or bars in a single session.

Background

Many European cities have public pub crawls that serve as social gatherings for local expatriates and tourists.

In the UK, pub crawls are generally spontaneous nights out in which the participants arrange to meet somewhere and decide over drinks where to drink next. Structured routes with regular stops are rare. Most drinking sessions based around a special occasion such as a birthday or a leaving celebration will involve a pub crawl, often with the group splitting up but agreeing on meeting at the next location. It is a common sight in UK towns to see several groups orbiting the various drinking locations with little apparent coherence or structure.

In the north of Spain, around the Basque Country, the tradition for groups of male friends crawling pubs and drinking a short glass of wine at each pub, and often singing traditional songs, is known as txikiteo or chiquiteo, and can be held at night or day. By the end of the 20th century, it was extended also to women, and when it involves a wider variety of drinks, it is more often called poteo.

By country

United Kingdom

In Glasgow, the Subcrawl is a pub crawl carried out using the circular Glasgow Subway line in the city. It involves having a drink at the nearest pub to each of the 15 stops on the line.

In Leeds, the Otley Run is seen as a rite of passage for students.

In London, the Monopoly board pub crawl is based around having a drink at a pub in each of the places on a British Monopoly board, set in London.

Also in London, thousands of New Zealanders take part in the annual Waitangi Day pub crawl, a crawl around the Circle Line on the London Underground. Starting at Paddington they work anti-clockwise around the line, ending at Westminster for a haka (traditional New Zealand challenge/dance). While numbers vary depending on the weather, in 2008 there were reported to be around 12,000 people involved.

In York, there is an annual charity event known as the Assize of Ale. It is based on the medieval Assize of Bread and Ale and led by the Guild of Scriveners and Sheriff and of the City.

The film The World's End starring Simon Pegg and Nick Frost is plotted around a group of friends embarking on a pub crawl in their home town.

Australia

In Adelaide, a pub crawl is run annually by The Adelaide University Engineering Society (AUES). The event attracts students from all over South Australia to as many as 34 local pubs and clubs. In 2015 the event had 6,000 participants while 2014 and 2013 both had 5,000 participants.

In Brisbane, the Mining and Metallurgy Association (MAMA) at the University of Queensland have been awarded the Brisbane City Council (BCC) and University of Queensland Union (UQU) Award for Social Activities of the Year due to their well-known Pub Crawl.

A pub crawl held annually in Maryborough, Queensland, Australia, attracted 4,718 participants on 14 June 2009.

Ireland
A pub crawl in December is called the "12 pubs of Christmas" in which participants try to drink one drink in 12 pubs while wearing Christmas clothes.

Japan
In Japan, pub crawls are called hashigozake (はしご酒, literally "Ladder Alcohol") and are a part of the night-life. Events of organized pub crawls are also common in the country.

Belgium
The city of Antwerp has a tradition called "elfkroegentocht" or "eleven bars walk" where a company, often friends or work relatives, will celebrate by walking from one bar to the next and have a "bolleke" of De Koninck beer at each. The figure of "11" may refer to carnival festivities.

Finland 
In Finland, Pub Crawls are a common student event, usually by the name of Appro. The best known Appro events attract students from all over the country: Hämeenkadun Appro in Tampere has roughly 10,000 participants every year, Kauppakadun Appro in Jyväskylä has c. 8000.

Often the participants of the event receive a jacket patch, which is then sewn onto the student boilersuits worn by many in the Appro events. Normally, the colour of the patch depends on how many drinks one has had during the pub crawl; for example, in Kauppakadun Appro, getting the golden patch requires 17 drinks from women and 19 drinks from men.

New Zealand 
The annual Talk Like a Pirate Day pubcrawl is run in New Plymouth every year. It started in 2005 with only three pirates and over the years has grown to hundreds.

United States
The Running A Tab Pub Run takes place monthly in San Antonio, Texas, and is hosted by WeRunSanAntonio. The original Running A Tab Pub Run covered 5 miles in downtown San Antonio. The starting point was the historic Sunset Station and finished at the Blue Star Brewery and Art Complex. The event is held in conjunction with San Antonio's First Friday Art Walk. In 2009 the route was modified to accommodate the more than 500 participants every month. Running A Tab now consists of a 3-mile downtown loop and 5 bars/restaurants. A theme is selected every month and participants dress in costume in accordance with the theme. The event is free and open to the public.

In Charlotte, North Carolina, there is a yearly pub crawl on the Saturday nearest to Saint Patrick's Day sponsored by Rich and Bennett. According to the Rich and Bennett website it is billed as the World's Largest Pub Crawl with over 20,000 participants all wearing the event t-shirts. In 2020 it was postponed due to the coronavirus Pandemic. It was rescheduled for 27 June.

An annual St. Patrick's Day bar crawl, LepreCon, takes place in Hoboken, New Jersey. The 2016 event, held in the evening 5–6 March, degenerated into a violent brawl. Fifteen people were arrested and 35 hospitalized, including two police officers. The officers were injured when one of the participants was seeking to flee the scene. Hoboken police responded to 432 calls from service during the event and issued 54 tickets, mostly for public drinking. The 2015 event resulted in 93 summonses and 11 arrests. The 2016 LepreCont cost the City of Hoboken $110,000 in police overtime. Two hundred officers were deployed for the event. Hoboken's police chief, Ken Ferrante, said he was "disturbed by the repeated behavior that is occurring on these types of themed events," and said he "will not tolerate having any of our officers injured, for the purposes of a few to make a financial profit at the expense of our residents."

In Louisville, Kentucky, the "Bambi Walk" has been underway since the 1980s.

In Minneapolis, Minnesota, a zombie-themed pub crawl commenced in 2005 and had grown to over 30,000 participants in 2012.

At Epcot in Walt Disney World, guests often do a form of bar crawl known as Drink Around the World, where visitors attempt to drink at all eleven countries of World Showcase.

Spain 
Spain is one of the main destinations for travelers and in its main cities such as Barcelona and Madrid there are the best Pub Crawls. In these environments it is usually very youthful, since there are several Erasmus students who come and do massive pub crawls. In Barcelona the pub crawl  go to the city center and end up in famous trendy clubs like Pacha that are next to the beach. In Madrid you can find pubcrawl all year round thanks to the fact that winter is not as cold as in other European cities. In the spring they have a massive St. Patrick's pub crawl, on halloween the zombie pub crawl and in December a santa pub crawl.

Santa-theme pub crawls

The SantaCon pub crawl originated in San Francisco in 1994 and has since spread to 300 cities in 44 countries, including New York City. London, Vancouver, Belfast and Moscow. The New York SantaCon is the largest, with an estimated 30,000 people participating in 2012. Other events were much smaller and more subdued, with 30 participating in Spokane, Washington.

In New York City, where it has taken place since 1997, it has come under widespread criticism for rowdiness by participants, with drunken behavior that has disrupted parts of Manhattan and Brooklyn, and led to calls for the event to be ended and for participant misbehavior to be curbed. Former Police Commissioner Raymond Kelly said that despite "some rowdy actions by a small handful of people in the past," SantaCon was "an event that we support. It's what makes New York New York." During the New York City SantaCon in 2012, participants "left a trail of trouble" through Hell's Kitchen, Midtown Manhattan, the East Village and Williamsburg. Residents complained revelers vomited and urinated in the street and fought with each other.

In London, the London Santa Pub Crawl has been held each December since 2004. The event sees participants dress up as Santa Claus, and visit a selection of London pubs along a pre-planned route. From just 25 participants in its first year, the event now sees more than 300 Santas take to the streets to enjoy the festivities. Participants are asked to donate to support the event's nominated charity, and more than £5,000 has been raised over the years for the British Red Cross and St Christopher's Hospice. The 2014 London Santa Pub Crawl took place on Saturday 13 December 2014.

In Brisbane, Australia, the Christmas Pub Crawl runs each year on the first Saturday following the end of the school year in December. This event has been running annually since 1982 and is now "the world's longest running pub crawl". Santa-themed pub crawls also take place each December in  the towns of Wollongong and Grafton, with proceeds donated to charity.  In 2015 local police announced cancellation of the Grafton event,  but were opposed by the mayor.

See also 

 Drinking culture
 Groundhopping
 List of public house topics
 Organ crawl
 Pub golf
 Rail Ale Ramble
 SantaCon
 The World's End
 Zombie Pub Crawl

References

 
Drinking games
Articles containing video clips